Tordher is a town in the Swabi District of the Khyber Pakhtunkhwa province in Pakistan. It is the second leading trading city in the district, after Swabi. The town is located on rich, alluvial soil.  It is situated near the rivers Kabul and Indus.

The city was incorporated as a municipality in 1998, when it had a population of 27,861. By 2017, it had grown to 41,420, which meant that the average annual population growth rate of the city was about 2.1% during that period. It is the third-largest city in Swabi District, and the fifth-largest city in Mardan Division.

There are 30 primary schools, two high schools and one higher secondary school.

The town is known for its cricket ground where sport events are arranged throughout the year.

See also 

 List of cities in Khyber Pakhtunkhwa by population
 Swabi Tehsil
 Topi
 Zaida

References

Populated places in Swabi District